The following television stations operate on virtual channel 68 in the United States:

 KPXD-TV in Arlington, Texas
 KTLN-TV in Novato, California
 WABM in Birmingham, Alabama
 WBPX-TV in Boston, Massachusetts
 WDTJ-LD in Toledo, Ohio
 WEFS in Cocoa, Florida
 WFUT-DT in Newark, New Jersey
 WIWN in Fond du Lac, Wisconsin
 WJAL in Hagerstown, Maryland
 WKMJ-TV in Louisville, Kentucky
 WLFG in Grundy, Virginia
 WMFD-TV in Mansfield, Ohio
 WNYS-CD in Ithaca, New York
 WSYT in Syracuse, New York
 WVSN in Humacao, Puerto Rico

The following stations, which are no longer licensed, formerly operated on virtual channel 68 in the United States:
 W38FI-D in Laurel, Mississippi

References

68 virtual